Lena Khan is a film director and writer. She co-wrote and directed The Tiger Hunter (2016) and directed the Disney+ movie Flora & Ulysses (2021).

Early life and career 
Khan was born in Canada to Indian parents. Khan grew up Rancho Cucamonga, California before graduating from UCLA's film school. She is a Muslim. Khan has also written and directed short films. Her directorial debut was The Tiger Hunter, a film partially based on her grandfather who was a tiger hunter. Her second film, Flora & Ulysses, was released in February 2021. Khan was on the 2020 Alice Initiative's "List of Emerging Female Directors".

References

External links

American film directors
American Muslims
Year of birth missing (living people)
Living people
American film directors of Indian descent
American screenwriters of Indian descent